The 2020–21 Linafoot was the 60th season of the Linafoot, the top-tier football league in the Democratic Republic of the Congo, since its establishment in 1958. The season started on 2 October 2020 and ended on 9 June 2021 Defending champions TP Mazembe won their 3rd consecutive and 19th overall Linafoot title.

Teams changes
16 teams compete in this season: the top 14 teams from the previous season and two promoted teams from the 2019–20 Linafoot Ligue 2. 

Relegated from Ligue 1
 OC Bukavu Dawa
 AS Nyuki

Promoted from Ligue 2
 Blessing FC
 JS Kinshasa

League table

References

External links
 Official website

Linafoot seasons
Congo DR